Pandemis cerasana, the barred fruit-tree tortrix, is a moth of the family Tortricidae.

Distribution
This quite common species is found in Europe, from the Iberian Peninsula to the Ural Mountains and the Caucasus, east to southern Siberia, Kazakhstan, Mongolia, China and the Far East. It is also found in Asia Minor and Iran. It is an introduced species in North America.

Habitat

The barred fruit-tree tortrix live in woodland areas, gardens and orchards.

Description
The wingspan of Pandemis cerasana can reach 16–25 mm. Forewings ground colour ranges from pale ocher yellow to greyish brown with a large dark chestnut brown V marking and a dark brown lateral spot. The outer margin of forewings is sinuous, slightly oblique.

The hind wings are almost uniform greyish brown. Antennae of the males have a notch near the base. They are light green, thin and flattened.

These tortrix moths usually rest holding their bell-shaped wings in a flattened posture.

Biology
In western Europe these moths fly from June to August, mainly from dusk into the night. This species has two generations a year, the second generation larva being the winter form.

The larvae are polyphagous and feed on various deciduous trees and shrubs (Abies, Alnus, Acer, Betula, Crataegus, Fraxinus, Quercus) including fruit-trees (especially apple and pear, hazelnut (Corylus), currant (Ribes), blackberry and raspberry (Rubus) and cherry and plum (Prunus).

References

External links

Lepiforum.de
Commanster

Pandemis
Moths described in 1786
Moths of Asia
Tortricidae of Europe
Moths of North America